Cyberchase is an animated mathematics series that currently airs on PBS Kids. The show revolves around three Earth children (Jackie, Matt, and Inez), who use mathematics and problem-solving skills in a quest to save Cyberspace from a villain known as The Hacker. The three are transported into Cyberspace by Motherboard, the ruler of this virtual realm. Together with Motherboard's helper, Digit (a robotic bird), the three new friends compose the Cybersquad.

Each animated episode is followed by a live-action For Real interstitial before the credits, hosted by young, comedic actors who explore the episode's math topic in the real world. The show itself is created by the Thirteen Education division of WNET (channel 13), the PBS station for Greater New York.

After the fifth episode of Season 8 in 2010, Cyberchase went on hiatus. However, on April 3, 2013, it was announced on the show's official Facebook page that it would return for a ninth season during the fall.

On February 10, 2015, Gilbert Gottfried, the voice of Digit, announced that five new episodes were expected to be broadcast in the  half of that year as the show's tenth season. In April 2015, the show's Twitter account retweeted a photo indicating that the season would focus on health, math and the environment.

In January 2017, it was announced that Cyberchase would be returning for an eleventh season, with ten new episodes set to air later in the year. In May, producer Kristin DiQuollo and director Meeka Stuart answered questions about the show in a 19-minute video.

In October 2018, it was announced that Cyberchase would air for a twelfth season. The season premiered with a movie special on April 19, 2019, with the remaining episodes set to begin airing in the fall; however, all but two of the episodes premiered in 2020.

A thirteenth season was confirmed by Robert Tinkler, the voice actor of Delete, on Twitter, which premiered on February 25, 2022.

A fourteenth season will premiere on April 21, 2023.

Series overview

Episodes

Webisodes (2001, 2003, and 2005)
Preceding the televised animated episodes, in December 2001, three webisodes called "How It All Started" were added to the website.

Webisode 1 had 16 panels.
Webisode 2 had 13 panels.
Webisode 3 had 13 panels.

By April 13, 2003, the trilogy was expanded into "Web Adventures", with a 4th webisode called NUMBERLESS PUDDLES! which had 20 panels.

On December 14, 2005, a 5th webisode called HACKER JACK was added, which had 4 panels.

The "Web Adventures" webisodes page was still up in December 2012, but as of March 8, 2014, it was changed into a redirect to the Math Games page introduced in 2011.

Season 1 (2002)
In the pilot episode "Lost My Marbles", Hacker infects Motherboard with a computer virus. At a library on Earth, while looking at a computer, Jackie, Matt, and Inez (who accidentally let Hacker unleash the virus by touching the computer map at the same time) are sucked through an interdimensional portal into Cyberspace. In their first adventure, they go to an island to rescue Dr. Marbles. In subsequent adventures, they return to Cyberspace to thwart Hacker's evil plans, which vary from ruining Motherboard to trying to take over a Cybersite. Throughout the season, the Cybersquad searched for a new encryptor chip for Motherboard. In Episode 9, Buzz and Delete nearly retrieved the encryptor chip, but lost it in a dust storm, much to Hacker's frustration.

All episodes this season were directed by Larry Jacobs. "The Poddleville Case" was co-directed by Yvette Kaplan.

Season 2 (2003)
This season is a continuation of the same basic plot of season one. However, the focus on the search for the Encryptor Chip is shown less as the season deals more with a new scenario; each episode involving Hacker seeking to take over a cybersite or all of Cyberspace, or plot a nefarious scheme in which he is wreaking chaos and havoc somewhere. In addition, a continued appearance of Wicked, a witch from the cybersite Happily-Ever-After occurred, revealing her strong feeling towards Hacker, while Hacker only used her abilities as a witch to further his own evil tactics as seen in episode "The Wedding Scammer", although he did show mutual feelings towards her in "Harriet Hippo & the Mean Green", but once again, he became self-centered and cared less about her. In a way, the occurrences of "The Wedding Scammer" are the only of Wicked's evenings where she is successful with her affections. The character of Sam Vander Rom (Al Roker) is introduced in 204 and 208 and Erica Ram is introduced in 211, where she hosts Cyberscoop alongside him. In this second season, Hacker continues to run rampant, causing more chaos, and thus the Cybersquad returns to almost every Cybersite. The Wicked Witch also makes additional appearances.

All episodes this season were directed by Larry Jacobs.

Season 3 (2004)
In the third season, the kids meet Slider, a rebel-style skateboarder who lives in the cybersite Radopolis. He first appears in the episode "The Borg of the Ring" where he retrieved the Totally Rad Ring of Radopolis from Hacker. Once again and then a third time Hacker tries to take control of Radopolis, first by almost winning a competition, then by putting everyone except Digit, Slider, and the Cybersquad asleep so he fails. The kids are told his father, Coop, had abandoned him. Coop was on a distant cyber-planet, but the kids didn't know that yet.

This season contains the first two-part episode of the series, "The Snelfu Snafu". While Slider was searching for his father, he stumbled across the location of the elusive encryptor chip. When he alerted the Cybersquad, they soon discovered it was in the hands of an auctioneer. The kids eventually earned enough money to win it, but they discovered the chip was infected to drain Motherboard, replacing her with Hacker. The kids were then placed in the dungeon at the new Hacker Control Central; when they escaped, they searched for the encryptor chip because Motherboard was trapped in it. Upon finding it, they also rescued Dr. Marbles. However, when they attempted to put the chip in the circuits, the hardware rejected it because Hacker has corrupted it. Dr. Marbles was forced to reboot Motherboard, destroying the chip in the process. This concludes the Encryptor Chip story-arc. Also, Hacker rejects Wicked, setting the stage for some future episodes.

All episodes this season were directed by Larry Jacobs.

Season 4 (2005)
The Cybersquad is at it again, and meets even more new allies like Fluff the penguin. However, situations become more complicated now that Hacker is no longer the only villain attempting to rule Cyberspace; the Wicked Witch has been planning schemes of her own. On top of that, Hacker is now travelling all over Cyberspace to conquer unspoiled regions – and the Cybersquad soon learns that this may tie in with the disappearance of Slider's Dad. He steals the Electric Eel of Aquari-yum as a power source, and the Pedestal of Penguia as a relay for the power-flow, and combines these items with other gizmos and gadgets to form the Transformatron, a device with the capability of transforming anyone into anything. After taking the NIC (Network Interface Card) from Slider's dad, taking Coop (Tony Hawk) hostage, and kidnapping Slider, the device was complete. However, the Cybersquad was able to thwart Hacker's plans again by dismantling the device so it could not be used again and allowing the effects of the Transformatron to wear off. 

This is the last season directed by Larry Jacobs, who had directed every episode up to this point.

Season 5 (2006−07)
At long last, Slider's dad comes home. However, simply because many of the parts used on the Transformatron before have disappeared does not mean Hacker has given up on it, so now the Cybersquad find themselves building, fixing, and inventing devices to stop Hacker from taking over. When the Transformatron goes on the loose, Digit and the kids must dispose of the NIC card, the only power source of Hacker's machine. New villains Olga (Annika Walter) and the Trashinator (Phil Collins) make their debut during this season.

During the season, a special two-hour program, "Cyberchase: My Big Idea!" was broadcast. The program comprised episodes 64–67 shown sequentially, and was built around the theme of inventions. Each episode covered a different invention topic. The program was hosted by Bianca and Harry from Cyberchase For Real! and in between episodes, they talked about inventions that were made by kids, and showed clips of kids who had made inventions of their own.

Len Carlson, as the original voice of Buzz, was replaced about halfway through the season by Philip Williams. Carlson died in 2006, and the episode "EcoHaven Ooze" was dedicated to him. Williams began voicing Buzz starting with "The Halloween Howl". This was the last season that was animated by Nelvana and the last one traditionally animated, before moving over to Flash animation by PiP Animation Services, starting with season six.

All episodes this season were directed by Jason Groh.

Season 6 (2007–08)
Finally, the NIC had been disposed of, which means that there are no more episodes involving the Transformatron. Unfortunately, Hacker hopes to expand his group of evil doers, now including Baskerville, Trashinator, and a gorilla named Tonga. With new allies for Hacker, the Cybersquad once again attempts to stop him. Meanwhile, love chaos ensues between Hacker and Wicked when Hacker starts to want Wicked back, but the Wicked Witch could want nothing more than to spit on him. This is the first season to use Flash animation.

This is the first season where Buzz is voiced by Philip Williams from beginning to end.

All episodes this season were directed by Brandon Lloyd.

Season 7 (2009)
A lot may be going on in Cyberspace, but the Cybersquad shall continue to stop Hacker – even if it means dealing with terrible weather and using math knowledge to combat it. Season 7 starts with "Weather Watchers", which first aired on April 20, 2009. In the first two episodes, "For Real" segments included Janice Huff, a meteorologist with New York's WNBC-TV who played "Stormy Gale" in episodes 83–84.

All episodes this season were directed by Brandon Lloyd

Season 8 (2010)
Season 8 premiered on June 25, 2010, and introduced Ledge (Alex Karzis),  a fan of Hacker and was to get himself a place on Hacker's side to help take over Cyberspace. He tries to do so by making a machine that can turn everyone in Sensible Flats into "Hackerized" versions of themselves. Though this impresses Hacker, Inez eventually unplugs the machine, resulting an angry Hacker to cast Ledge away for his failure. This results with Ledge becoming Hacker's most dangerous rival. Aside from Ledge's failure, Hacker does not like Ledge because he heavily insults him and the possible fact that Ledge is less arrogant but more intelligent than Hacker, even though he is equally evil. The Cybersquad also does not like Ledge because of his deception that led almost all of them into danger in Sensible Flats he had caused by pretending to help them, as he thinks more wisely of his plans. It was then in episode 94, that Hacker and the Cybersquad were forced to work together to stop Ledge from stealing one of Hacker's previous inventions that can be used to help Motherboard, though the invention ends up being destroyed.

This is the last season directed by Brandon Lloyd, who had directed every episode up to this point.

Season 9 (2013–14)
On April 3, 2013, it was announced on the official Facebook page that the show would return for a 9th season. The season premiered November 4, 2013, after being on hiatus since 2010. Issues in development for episode 95 caused some versions of the aired episode to air with the title "placeholder" cards in place. e.g. act 1, act 2, and act 3. In this season, Harley, Alicia, and Harry (from For Real) now work at Camp Henry teaching 8-year-old kids about the environment. Season 9 was animated in Flash by Pip Animation in Ottawa.

All episodes this season were directed by J. Meeka Stuart.

Season 10 (2015)
All episodes this season were directed by J. Meeka Stuart.

The opening theme song has an updated version to look consistent with the flash animation.

This is the first season to be in Widescreen.

Season 11 (2017–18)
All episodes this season were directed by J. Meeka Stuart.

Season 12 (2019–20)
All episodes this season were directed by J. Meeka Stuart.

Season 13 (2022)
This is the final season where Gilbert Gottfried provides the voice of Digit before his death on April 12, 2022.

Season 14 (2023)  
Following the death of Gilbert Gottfried on April 12, 2022, Ron Pardo now provides the voice of Digit.

Home media

DVD/VHS
Between 2002 and 2005, five Cyberchase titles were released on DVD and VHS. Each DVD release of the titles contained three episodes.

iTunes 
iTunes Canada has released the first eight seasons, though they are not always in original airdate and some strange season numbering has occurred. iTunes US has a collection of 24 random episodes, a couple of themed collections, and the two specials. See below tables.

References

Notes 

Lists of American children's animated television series episodes
Lists of Canadian children's animated television series episodes